Mevalonate kinase is an enzyme (specifically a kinase) that in humans is encoded by the MVK gene.  Mevalonate kinases are found in a wide variety of organisms from bacteria to mammals.  This enzyme catalyzes the following reaction:

.

Function 

Mevalonate is a key intermediate, and mevalonate kinase a key early enzyme, in isoprenoid and sterol synthesis. As the second enzyme in the Mevalonate pathway, it catalyzes the phosphorylation of Mevalonic acid to produce Mevalonate-5-phosphate. A 5-10% reduction in mevalonate kinase activity is associated with the mevalonate kinase deficiency (MVD) resulting in accumulation of intermediate mevalonic acid.

Clinical significance
Defects can be associated with hyperimmunoglobulinemia D with recurrent fever.

Mevalonate kinase deficiency caused by mutation of this gene results in mevalonic aciduria, a disease characterized psychomotor retardation, failure to thrive, hepatosplenomegaly, anemia and recurrent febrile crises. Defects in this gene also cause hyperimmunoglobulinaemia D and periodic fever syndrome, a disorder characterized by recurrent episodes of fever associated with lymphadenopathy, arthralgia, gastrointestinal dismay and skin rash. The symptoms of the disease typically start at infancy and may be additionally triggered by stress or bacterial infection. Children with mevalonate kinase deficiency may remain undiagnosed for a long time as there is not enough scientific data at the moment to accurately diagnose children with the disease.

See also 
 Mevalonic aciduria
 Mevalonic acid

References

Further reading

External links 
 
 PDBe-KB provides an overview of all the structure information available in the PDB for Human Mevalonate kinase

EC 2.7.1
Human proteins